Shirley Elizabeth Barnes (born 1938) is a former United States diplomat.
A career Foreign Service officer, she was appointed United States Ambassador to Madagascar from June 29, 1998 to July 28, 2001.

Life 
Barnes was born on April 5, 1938 in St. Augustine, Florida. When she was five years old, her family moved to Saratoga, New York.

Education 
In 1956 she graduated from Baruch College with a Bachelor's degree in business. During her college years, she joined the Delta Sigma Theta sorority, the National Association for the Advancement of Colored People (NAACP), and became fluent in French.

She later studied International Affairs at Boston University. She received a master's degree in business administration from Columbia University in 1970.

She was a part of the Senior Seminar Class of the National War College graduating in 1995.

Career 
Before joining the Foreign Service, Barnes became vice president in several major advertising agencies and worked for the Ford Foundation from 1961- 1965 in the Republic of Congo, Kinshasa. After returning to the U.S. in 1965, she worked for the historic African-American Institute in New York City.

In 1983, Barnes joined the U.S. Foreign Service and became a General Services Officer at the U.S. Embassy in Egypt. She was promoted in 1986 to the Supervisor for the General Services Office at the Embassy in Senegal. From 1990 to 1992, Barnes worked as a Counselor for Administration in East Berlin, Germany.

Barnes was the director of Western European affairs in the Bureau of European Affairs at the United States Department of State and served as a diplomat in West Berlin, Cairo, Sofia, and Dakar. She was also consul general in Strasbourg, France.

In 1998, Barnes became the U.S. Ambassador to Madagascar and served until her retirement in 2001.

In 2004 she founded the Barnes Findley Foundation, a non-profit foundation dedicated to supporting women and girls in the African Diaspora with an emphasis on anti-human trafficking and economic empowerment.

Barnes received an honorary doctor of laws degree in 2006 from Knox College.

She is a member of the Delta Sigma Theta sorority and the American Foreign Service Association. She is also an avid patron of African art and speaks French.

References

External links
AMBASSADOR SHIRLEY ELIZABETH BARNES, Association for Diplomatic Studies and Training - Foreign Affairs Oral History Project
“Diplomat Shirley Barnes Is Confirmed For Envoy Post In Madagascar.” Jet 94.10 (1998): 37–. Print.

1938 births
African-American diplomats
Baruch College alumni
Columbia Business School alumni
Delta Sigma Theta members
Living people
Ambassadors of the United States to Madagascar
Place of birth missing (living people)
Ambassadors of the United States to the Comoros
Boston University College of Arts and Sciences alumni
United States Foreign Service personnel
American women ambassadors
21st-century African-American people
21st-century African-American women
20th-century American diplomats
21st-century American diplomats
20th-century African-American people
20th-century African-American women